Henry Stephens Randall (May 3, 1811 – August 14, 1876 Cortland, Cortland County, New York) was an American agriculturist, writer, educator and politician who served as New York Secretary of State.

Life
He was the son of General Roswell Randall and Harriet (Stephens) Randall, of Shelburne, Vermont. He came as a young boy from Madison County, New York to Cortland.

He wrote many articles for agricultural periodicals, and Sheep Husbandry, the "sheepman's bible" of the times.

On February 4, 1834, Randall married in Auburn, New York, Jane Rebecca Polhemus, the daughter of Rev. Henry Polhemus and Jane (Anderson) Polhemus. They had a son, Roswell Stephens Randall (born November 8, 1834) who married Mary Forby, of Albany, New York. Henry's son Francis died on June 29, 1844, aged 21 months. His daughter Hattie S. Randall married D. J. Mosher, MD, on June 18, 1872.

In November 1849, he ran for Secretary of State on the Democratic ticket but was defeated by Whig Christopher Morgan. He was Secretary of State of New York from 1852 to 1853, elected in November 1851.

Randall wrote The Life of Thomas Jefferson, published in three volumes in 1858.  He was the only biographer permitted to interview Jefferson’s immediate family. In a letter to James Parton he relates that the family believed Jefferson's nephew Peter Carr was the father of Sally Hemings's children.

Randall was a delegate to the 1860 Democratic National Convention; and a member of the New York State Assembly (Cortland Co.) in 1871.

He was buried at the Cortland Rural Cemetery.

Sources
His letter to James Parton about Thomas Jefferson, FRONTLINE, PBS
His daughter's marriage at Vital Statistics for Cortland County, transcribed from The Cortland County Standard
His son Francis's death at Vital statistics of Cortland County, transcribed from Cortland Democrat
Short bio at Cortland History
Obituary note of his sister Lucy Maria Randall Hoes, July 30, 1898, The New York Times

External links to Works
The Life of Thomas Jefferson, Volume 1, (EPUB format)
The Life of Thomas Jefferson, Volume 2
The Life of Thomas Jefferson, Volume 3, (EPUB format)
Address, Ohio Wool Growers Association, January 6, 1864

1811 births
1876 deaths
Secretaries of State of New York (state)
Union College (New York) alumni
Democratic Party members of the New York State Assembly
19th-century American politicians